This article contains information about the literary events and publications of 1774.

Events
February 22 – The English legal case of Donaldson v Beckett is decided in the House of Lords, denying the continued existence of a perpetual common law copyright and holding that copyright is a creation of statute and can be limited in its duration. This does permit authors to claim copyright on their own works.
September 14 – A new Stadsschouwburg (municipal theatre) in Amsterdam opens with the première of Lucretia Wilhelmina van Merken's tragedy Jacob Simonszoon de Ryk.
September 29 – Johann Wolfgang von Goethe's semi-autobiographical epistolary novel The Sorrows of Young Werther (Die Leiden des jungen Werthers) (written January – March) is published anonymously in Leipzig, Germany; it is influential in the Sturm und Drang movement and Romanticism.
unknown dates
After the destruction of the Schloss Weimar by fire, Karl August, Grand Duke of Saxe-Weimar-Eisenach, forms a commission for its reconstruction directed by Johann Wolfgang von Goethe.
James Lackington begins in the London bookselling business.
Johann Gottlob Theaenus Schneider becomes secretary to Richard François Philippe Brunck.
The National and University Library of Slovenia in Ljubljana is established as the Lyceum Library, from the remains of the dissolved Jesuit library and several monastery libraries.
Alberto Fortis publishes Viaggio in Dalmazia ("Journey to Dalmatia") and starts Morlachism.

New books

Fiction
Jeremy Bentham – The White Bull
Henry Brooke – Juliet Grenville
Johann Wolfgang von Goethe – The Sorrows of Young Werther
Charles Johnstone – The History of Arsaces
The Newgate Calendar
Christoph Martin Wieland – Die Abderiten, eine sehr wahrscheinliche Geschichte (The Abderites: A Very Probable Story)

Children
Johann Bernhard Basedow – Elementarwerk (first of four volumes)

Drama
Miles Peter Andrews – The Election
John Burgoyne – The Maid of the Oaks
George Colman the Elder – The Man of Business
Richard Cumberland – The Note of Hand 
Charles Dibdin – The Waterman
Alexander Dow – Sethona
Johann Wolfgang von Goethe – Clavigo
Hugh Kelly – The Romance of an Hour
Jakob Michael Reinhold Lenz – The Tutor (Der Hofmeister)
Gaspar Melchor de Jovellanos – El delincuente honrado

Poetry

James Beattie – The Minstrel, volume 2
William Dunkin – Poetical Works
Oliver Goldsmith – Retaliation
Richard Graves – The Progress of Gallantry
William Mason – An Heroic Postscript to the Public
Hannah More – The Inflexible Captive
Samuel Jackson Pratt (as Courtney Melmoth) – The Tears of A Genius, occasioned by the Death of Dr. Goldsmith
Henry James Pye – Farringdon Hill
Mary Scott – The Female Advocate
Candido Maria Trigueros – El poeta filósofo o Poesías filosóficas en verso pentámetro
William Whitehead – Plays and Poems, by William Whitehead, Esq. Poet Laureat

Non-fiction
Giacomo Casanova – Istoria delle turbolenze della Polonia
Mary Deverell – Sermons
Alberto Fortis – Viaggio in Dalmazia
Martin Gerbert – De cantu et musica sacra
Oliver Goldsmith
The Grecian History
An History of the Earth and Animated Nature
Henry Home – Sketches of the History of Man
John Hutchins (died 1773) – The History and Antiquities of Dorset
Thomas Jefferson – A Summary View of the Rights of British America
Samuel Johnson – The Patriot
Antoine-Simon Le Page du Pratz – The History of Louisiana, or of the Western Parts of Virginia and Carolina (English translation of Histoire de la Louisiane (1758) in 1 vol.)
Joseph Priestley – Experiments and Observations on Different Kinds of Air
William Richardson – A Philosophical Analysis and Illustration of Some of Shakespeare's Remarkable Characters
Pedro Rodríguez, Count of Campomanes – Discurso sobre el fomento de la industria popular
Philip Stanhope, 4th Earl of Chesterfield – Letters to his Son
Sugita Genpaku – Kaitai Shinsho (解体新書, "New Text on Anatomy", Japanese translation of Ontleedkundige Tafelen)
Horace Walpole – A Description of Strawberry-Hill
Thomas Warton – The History of English Poetry, volume 1
John Wesley – Thoughts upon Slavery

Births
January 1 – Pietro Giordani, Italian translator, scholar and writer (died 1848)
February 24 – Archibald Constable, Scottish publisher (died 1827)
July 14 – Francis Lathom, Dutch-born English Gothic novelist and dramatist (died 1832)
August 12 – Robert Southey, English poet and Poet Laureate (died 1843)

Deaths
April 4 – Oliver Goldsmith, Irish dramatist (born 1728/1730)
April 28 – Gottfried Lengnich, German/Polish historian (born 1689)
September 17 – Abraham Langford, English auctioneer and playwright (born 1711)
October 16 – Robert Fergusson, Scottish poet (head injury, born 1750)
unknown date – Catherine Michelle de Maisonneuve, French editor and writer

References

 
Years of the 18th century in literature